George Loomis Becker (February 4, 1829 – January 6, 1904) was an American lawyer and Democratic politician who was mayor of Saint Paul, Minnesota.

Life and career
Becker was born in Locke, New York in 1829. He attended Case Western Reserve University and the University of Michigan Law School before relocating to St. Paul, Minnesota in 1849 to practice law. He formed a partnership with Edmund Rice and Ellis Whitall which lasted until 1856.

He first entered politics in 1854 when he was elected as a city council member for St. Paul. In 1856 he was elected mayor of St. Paul and served for a single one year term. He participated in the Democratic Minnesota Constitutional Convention in 1857 and was elected as one of three people to serve in the United States House of Representatives for the newly organized state. When it was revealed that the state would only receive two seats, Becker was the one left out. By some accounts he withdrew from consideration while others suggest the three candidates drew straws and Becker was the one who lost.

Becker went on to serve in the administration of Governor Henry Hastings Sibley as well as two terms in the Minnesota State Senate from 1868 to 1872. He unsuccessfully ran for Governor of Minnesota twice (in 1859 and 1894) and for a seat in the US House of Representatives (in 1872). Outside of politics he spent much of his later life working in the railroad industry including positions with the Saint Paul and Pacific Railroad and the Western Railroad of Minnesota. He also served on the state's Railroad and Warehouse Commission from 1885 to 1901.

Loomis died in St. Paul on January 6, 1904. He is buried in Oakland Cemetery in St. Paul.

Becker County, Minnesota and Becker, Minnesota are named in his honor.

References

1829 births
1904 deaths
Mayors of Saint Paul, Minnesota
People from Cayuga County, New York
Democratic Party Minnesota state senators
University of Michigan Law School alumni
19th-century American politicians